Hercules Névé is a névé at the northern margin of the Mountaineer Range in Victoria Land, Antarctica. It is bounded by Deception Plateau, Astronaut Glacier, the Retreat Hills, and by such western tributaries to the Mariner Glacier as Meander Glacier and Gair Glacier. It was named by the northern party of the New Zealand Geological Survey Antarctic Expedition, 1966–67, in appreciation of the party's transport into the field by U.S. Navy C-130 Hercules aircraft, also as an indication to future parties of a possible C-130 landing place.

References

Snow fields of Victoria Land
Borchgrevink Coast
Névés of Antarctica